Events in the year 1745 in Norway.

Incumbents
Monarch: Christian VI

Events

Arts and literature
 The construction of Paléet in Oslo is finished.

Births
21 March - Johan Nordahl Brun, poet, dramatist, bishop and politician (died 1816)
8 June - Caspar Wessel, mathematician (died 1818)

Deaths

See also